"The Ballad of Lucy Jordan" is a song by American poet and songwriter Shel Silverstein. It was originally recorded by Dr. Hook & the Medicine Show, with the name spelled "Jordon". The song describes the disillusionment and mental deterioration of a suburban housewife, who climbs to a rooftop "when the laughter grew too loud".

Marianne Faithfull version

Background 
The song was recorded by the English singer Marianne Faithfull for her 1979 album Broken English. This version was released as a single in October 1979, and became one of her highest-charting songs. It is featured on the soundtracks to the films Montenegro, Tarnation and Thelma & Louise. Faithfull also performed the song during a guest appearance in the episode "Donkey" from the fourth season of Absolutely Fabulous, in which God (Faithfull) sings the song in a dream to a miserable, dieting Edina. In 2016, the Faithfull version was used in the finale of American Horror Story: Hotel.

In an interview on ITV's The South Bank Show aired on 24 June 2007, Faithfull said that her interpretation was that Lucy climbs to the rooftop but gets taken away by "the man who reached and offered her his hand" in an ambulance ("long white car") to a psychiatric hospital, and that the final lines ("At the age of thirty-seven she knew she'd found forever / As she rode along through Paris with the warm wind in her hair ...") are actually in her imagination at the hospital. Thelma and Louise has a similar fatalistic theme.

Reception
Smash Hits said, "The Debbie Harry of the sixties returns to vinyl with an honestly outstanding offering, a version of an old Doctor Hook number related over a swimming synthesiser.  If you can handle this, it sounds like Dolly Parton produced by Brian Eno. Only better.""

AllMusic noted Faithfull's "faint vocal approach accompanied by the lone synthesizer emanates an eerie candor throughout the song's duration. This wispiness helps to build the fantasy/reality concept of the song, and shows Faithfull at her most sincere." Pitchfork mentioned the, "pain in her fractured voice".

The Arts Desk said, "Pin-sharp, it was laceratingly at one with the dark clouds gathering over music in the wake of punk."

Personnel
Marianne Faithfull – vocals
Steve Winwood – synthesizer

Charts

Other cover versions 
1975: Johnny Darrell, on his album Water Glass Full Of Whiskey
1976: Lee Hazlewood, on his album 20th Century Lee
1980: Marie Bottrell, on her album The Star, reached #10 in the Canadian country charts
1995: The Barra MacNeils, on their album The Question, reached #50 in the Canadian AC charts
1996: Belinda Carlisle, on her album A Woman and a Man
2000: Dennis Locorriere, on his album Out of the Dark (as the singer for Dr. Hook, he performed on the original version of the song)
2005: Bobby Bare, on his album The Moon Was Blue
2010: Lucinda Williams, on the Shel Silverstein tribute album Twistable Turnable Man
2017: Kikki Danielsson, on her album Portrait of a Painted Lady.

References

Songs about mental health
Songs about fictional female characters
1979 singles
1974 singles
Marianne Faithfull songs
Songs written by Shel Silverstein
Song recordings produced by Ron Haffkine
Dr. Hook & the Medicine Show songs
Bobby Bare songs
Lee Hazlewood songs
1974 songs
CBS Records singles
Island Records singles
Kikki Danielsson songs